The Orlogsværftet H-Maskinen was a Danish military reconnaissance biplane built at the Orlogsværftet Flying Machine Workshop in 1917 and in service until 1924. It was built out of wood and silver-doped canvas, held together by metal brackets. Turn-buckles and piano wire were used to true it up. A total of nine aircraft were built.

Specifications
Cruising speed:  
Max speed: 
Span: 
Empty weight: 
Full weight:  
Engine: 140 HP Argus
Crew: 2
Armament: One  Madsen machine gun in a movable rear mount
Cockpit: Open

References

 Military equipment of the interwar period